

Sibin s 
Sibin may refer to:
 Sibiu, Romania
Sibin, Tamil
Sibin, Kale, Burma
Sibin Slavković, Serbian comic book artist

Character of beast